The Turkey national under-17 football team is the national under-17 football team of Turkey and is controlled by the Turkish Football Federation. The team competes in the UEFA European Under-17 Football Championship, held every year. The original tournament was called the UEFA European Under-16 Football Championship (1982-2001). The tournament was renamed as the European Under-17 Football Championship in 2002, but importantly the overall statistics are collated from 1982. In addition, every odd year the top teams from the respective UEFA European Under-17 Football Championship compete in the FIFA U-17 World Cup the same year (since 2017, five teams from the respective UEFA European Under-17 Football Championship have been entered).

Competitive record

UEFA U-17 European Championship Record*

*The tournament was renamed as the European Under-17 Football Championship in 2002 (The original tournament was called the UEFA European Under-16 Football Championship (1982-2001)). Importantly the overall statistics are collated from 1982.
**Draws include knockout matches decided by penalty shoot-out.
***Gold background colour indicates that the tournament was won. Red border colour indicates tournament was held on home soil.
Q - Denotes qualified for the FIFA U-17 World Cup which is held every odd year.

FIFA U-17 World Cup Record

Notes:
 The first three tournaments (1985-1989) were referred to as the FIFA U-16 World Championships.
 Draws include knockout matches decided by penalty shoot-out.

Individual awards
In addition to team victories, Turkish players have won individual awards at UEFA European Under-17 Football Championship.

Recent results

Players

Current squad
 The following players were called up for the friendly matches.
 Match dates: 25 and 28 November 2022
 Opposition: Caps and goals correct as of:''' 25 November 2022, after the match against .

Recent call-ups
The following players were called up to the national team within the last twelve months and remain eligible for future call-ups.

Past squads

UEFA European Under-17 Football Championship squads
 2004 UEFA European Under-17 Championship squads
 2005 UEFA European Under-17 Championship squads
 2008 UEFA European Under-17 Championship squads
 2009 UEFA European Under-17 Championship squads
 2010 UEFA European Under-17 Championship squads
 2014 UEFA European Under-17 Championship squads

FIFA U-17 World Cup squads
 2005 FIFA U-17 World Cup squad
 2009 FIFA U-17 World Cup squad
 2017 FIFA U-17 World Cup squad

--->

See also
 Turkey national football team
Turkey national under-21 football team
 Turkey national under-20 football team
 Turkey national under-19 football team
 Turkey national under-17 football team
 Turkey national youth football team

References

under
European national under-17 association football teams